Vinicius Silveira de Mello (born 19 August 2002) is a Brazilian professional footballer who plays as a forward for Major League Soccer club Charlotte FC.

Club career 
Vinicius Mello made his professional debut for Sport Club Internacional on 27 February 2021, starting in the 1-0 Campeonato Gaúcho win against Juventude, among a very rejuvenated side.

During the start of this 2021 season, Vinicius was one of the most brilliant of Inter under-20s, scoring 5 goals and providing 1 assist in the first 4 games, having also signed a contract with the club until 2023, with a reported release clause of 60 million euros.

In May 2021, he was part of the Copa Libertadores squad who played the game against Always Ready, also playing the semi-final of the Copa do Brasil Sub-20 at the end of the month.

He played his first Série A game for Inter on 16 June 2021, replacing Yuri Alberto at the 76th minute of a 0-1 home loss against Atlético Minero.

On 13 December 2021, Mello joined Major League Soccer expansion side Charlotte FC.

References

External links

SC International profile 

2002 births
Living people
Brazilian footballers
Brazil youth international footballers
Association football forwards
Sportspeople from Rio Grande do Sul
Sport Club Internacional players
Campeonato Brasileiro Série A players
Charlotte FC players
Brazilian expatriate sportspeople in the United States
Brazilian expatriate footballers
Expatriate soccer players in the United States